Vahnabad Rural District is in the Central District of Robat Karim County, Tehran province, Iran. At the National Census of 2006, its population was 5,509 in 1,368 households. There were 8,219 inhabitants in 2,281 households at the following census of 2011. At the most recent census of 2016, the population of the rural district was 9,116 in 2,686 households. The largest of its six villages was Shotor Khvar, with 5,360 people.

References 

Robat Karim County

Rural Districts of Tehran Province

Populated places in Tehran Province

Populated places in Robat Karim County